This is a list of television productions produced by Universal Television and other NBCUniversal-owned companies, including television series, streaming television series, and television films.

Television series

Revue Studios

Universal Television

MCA TV

MTE

PolyGram Television/Universal Worldwide Television

Formerly known as ITC Entertainment from 1955-1997 until it was renamed to PolyGram Television. NBCU currently owns the post-ITC library of this company (consisting of product from 1997 to 1999) and the pre-PolyGram library (ITC era) is currently owned by ITV Studios.

Propaganda Films

Multimedia Entertainment

Studios USA Television/USA Cable Entertainment

NBC Studios
Formerly known as NBC Productions until 1996.

CBS Media Ventures currently distributes most of NBC's pre-1973 series. Most NBC programs after that point are distributed by NBCUniversal Syndication Studios in the U.S. and MGM Worldwide Television Distribution outside of the U.S.

California National Productions
Most of California National Productions' series are currently distributed by CBS Media Ventures.

Universal Content Productions
Formerly known as Universal Cable Productions until 2019.

Universal International Studios

Working Title Television

Chocolate Media

Lark Productions

Matchbox Pictures

Tony Ayres Productions

Carnival Films

Heyday Television

Monkey Kingdom

Lucky Giant

Universal Television Alternative Studio

Universal Animation Studios

NBCUniversal Cable Entertainment Group

Wilshire Studios

Comcast Entertainment Studios

Bravo Media Productions

Oxygen Media Productions

E! Entertainment Television

USA Network Media Productions

Sprout/Universal Kids Media Productions

Peacock Media Productions

NBCUniversal Telemundo Enterprises

Telemundo Global Studios

Telemundo International Studios

Noticias Telemundo

Underground Producciones

NBC Sports Group

USA Sports

NBC Sports

Telemundo Deportes

NBCUniversal News Group
 Project XX (1954–1970)
 Market Wrap (1989–2002)
 The Money Wheel (1989–1998)
 Steals and Deals (1990–1997)
 Hardball with Chris Matthews (1994–2020)
 Today's Business (1994–2002)
 Squawk Box (1995–present)
 MSNBC Live (1996–present)
 The News with Brian Williams (1996–2004)
 Power Lunch (1996–present)
 The Site (1996–1997)
 Street Signs (1996–2002, 2003–2015)
 Bull Session (1997–1998)
 Business Center (1997–2003)
 The Edge (1997–2002)
 Market Watch (1998–2002)
 The Abrams Report (2001–2006)
 America Now (2001–2002)
 Alan Keyes Is Making Sense (2002)
 Buchanan & Press (2002–2003)
 Closing Bell (2002–present)
 Donahue (2002–2003)
 Kudlow & Cramer (2002–2005)
 Morning Call (2002–2007)
 Wake Up Call (2002–2005)
 Bullseye (2003–2005)
 Jesse Ventura's America (2003)
 Scarborough Country (2003–2007)
 Morning Joe First Look (2004–2020)
 Connected: Coast to Coast (2005)
 Kudlow & Company (2005–2008)
 MSNBC at the Movies (2005)
 Mad Money (2005–present)
 On the Money (2005–2007, 2008–2009)
 Rita Cosby: Live & Direct (2005–2006)
 Squawk on the Street (2005–present)
 Tucker (2005–2008)
 Worldwide Exchange (2005–present)
 Weekends with Maury and Connie (2006)
 Fast Money (2006–present)
 The Most with Alison Stewart (2006–2007)
 Your Business (2006–2018)
 The Call (2007–2011)
 Morning Joe (2007–present)
 Verdict with Dan Abrams (2007–2008)
 1600 Pennsylvania Avenue (2008–2009)
 Dateline on ID (2008–2017)
 The Rachel Maddow Show (2008–present)
 Andrea Mitchell Reports (2008–present)
 Caught on Camera (2008–present)
 Dr. Nancy (2009)
 The Dylan Ratigan Show (2009–2012)
 The Ed Show (2009–2015)
 The Kudlow Report (2009–2014)
 Why Planes Crash (2009–2015)
 Way Too Early with Kasie Hunt (2009–2016; 2020–present)
 Disappeared (2009–2018)
 Jansing and Company (2010–2014)
 True Crime with Aphrodite Jones (2010–2016)
 NewsNation with Tamron Hall (2010–2018)
 Beyond The Headlines (2010–2020)
 The Last Word with Lawrence O'Donnell (2010–present)
 Killer Instinct (2011)
 Twist of Fate (2011–2012)
 Martin Bashir (2011–2013)
 Weather Caught on Camera (2011–2014)
 Now with Alex Wagner (2011–2015)
 Alex Witt Reports (2011–present)
 From the Edge with Peter Lik (2011)
 PoliticsNation with Al Sharpton (2011–present)
 Up (2011–2016; 2018–2020)
 Fatal Encounters (2012–2013)
 Caught on Camera Presents the Hitmen Tapes (2012–2015)
 The Cycle (2012–2015)
 Melissa Harris-Perry (2012–2016)
 All In with Chris Hayes (2013–present)
 Disrupt with Karen Finney (2013–2014)
 Up Late with Alec Baldwin (2013)
 The Presidents' Gatekeepers (2013) (co-production with CCWHIP Productions and Goldfish Pictures)
 More (2013) (co-production with Prospect Park and Tomorrow Productions)
 More All My Children (2013) (co-production with Prospect Park and Tomorrow Productions)
 More One Life to Move (2013) (co-production with Prospect Park and Tomorrow Productions)
 I'd Kill for You (2013–2016)
 Dead of Night (2013–2016)
 Deadline: Crime with Tamron Hall (2013–2019)
 Partners in Crime (2014)
 The Reid Report (2014–2015)
 Ronan Farrow Daily (2014–2015)
 Squawk Alley (2014–2021)
 Caught on Camera with Nick Cannon (2014–2016)
 Behind Closed Doors: Shocking Secrets (2015)
 Unraveled (2015–2016)
 Meet the Press Daily (2015–present)
 Dateline Extra (2016–2018)
 Behind Closed Doors (2016–2019)
 The 11th Hour (2016–present)
 Hate in America (2016)
 For the Record with Greta (2017)
 Behind Closed Doors: The American Family (2017)
 Navy SEALs: America's Secret Warriors (2017–2018)
 Deadline: White House (2017–present)
 Hugh Hewitt (2017–present)
 Dateline: Secrets Uncovered (2017–present)
 Kasie DC (2017–present)
 Final Appeal (2018) (co-production with Oxygen Media Productions)
 The Disappearance of Crystal Rogers (2018) (co-production with Oxygen Media Productions)
 Saturday Night Politics with Donny Deutsch (2019)
 Relentless with Kate Snow (2019) (co-production with Oxygen Media Productions)
 Ministry of Evil: The Twisted Cult of Tony Alamo (2019)
 American Swamp (2019)
 Killer Motive (2019–2021)
 Velshi (2020–present)
 The Overview (2021–present)
 TechCheck (2021–present)
 John Wayne Gacy: Devil in Disguise (2021–present) (co-production with Peacock Media Productions and Witchcraft Motion Picture Company)
 The Thing About Pam (2022; miniseries) (co-production with Blumhouse Television and Big Picture Co.)
 Gente Sana (TBA; miniseries) (co-production with Exile Content Studio)

NBC News

NBCUniversal Syndication Studios and NBCUniversal Global Distribution

DreamWorks Animation Television

Classic Media

UPA
 The Roy Rogers Show (1951–57) (distribution)
 The Gerald McBoing-Boing Show (1956–57)
 Mister Magoo (1960–1961)
 The Dick Tracy Show (1961–1962)
 The Famous Adventures of Mr. Magoo (1964–1965)
 What's New Mr. Magoo? (1977–1979) (co-produced with DePatie-Freleng Enterprises)

Harvey Entertainment
Noveltoons (1950-1962)
Screen Songs (1950-1951)
Casper the Friendly Ghost (1950-1959)
Herman and Katnip (1950-1959)
Kartunes (1951-1953)
Modern Madcaps (1958-1962)
Abner the Baseball (1961; two-reeler special)
The Baby Huey Show (1994-1995)
The Spooktacular New Adventures of Casper (1996-1998)
Richie Rich (1996)

Big Idea Entertainment

Golden Books Family Entertainment
Little Lulu and Her Little Friends (1976–77)
Girl Talk (1989)
Lamb Chop's Play-Along (1992–95)
The Little Lulu Show (1995–99) (co-production for Cinar and TMO-Loonland)
Lassie (1997 TV series) (1997–99) (co-production with Cinar and PolyGram Filmed Entertainment)
The Charlie Horse Music Pizza (1998–99)
Poky and Friends (1998)

T.E. Acquisition Company, Inc.
Rankin/Bass Animated Entertainment (pre-1974)
The New Adventures of Pinocchio (1960)
Tales of the Wizard of Oz (1961)
The King Kong Show (1966–1969)
The Smokey Bear Show (1969)
The Tomfoolery Show (1970–1971)
The Reluctant Dragon and Mr. Toad Show (1970)
The Jackson 5ive (1971)
The Osmonds (1972)
Kid Power (1972–1973)
Festival of Family Classics (1972)

Color Systems Technology, Inc.
Felix the Cat (1958–60)
Mack & Myer for Hire (1963–64)
The Mighty Hercules (1963–66)
American Caesar (1983)

Palladium Entertainment
The Lone Ranger (1949–57)
Lassie (1954 TV series) (1954–73)
Sergeant Preston of the Yukon (1955–58)
The Lone Ranger (animated TV series) (1966–68)
Skippy the Bush Kangaroo (1968–70)
Lassie's Rescue Rangers (1972–73)
The Lone Ranger (1980 TV series) (1980–82)
The New Lassie (1989–92) (co-production with Al Burton Productions and MCA TV)

Total Television
King Leonardo and His Short Subjects (1960–63)
Tennessee Tuxedo and His Tales (1963–66)
Underdog (1964–67)
The Beagles (1966–67)

Entertainment Rights
Formerly known as Sleepy Kids (1989–1999) and SKD Media (1999–2000).

Link Entertainment
Orm and Cheep (1983–1985)
The Family-Ness (1984–1985) (distribution; produced by Maddocks Animation)
The Trap Door (1984) (distribution; produced by CMTB Animation and Queensgate Productions)
Jimbo and the Jet Set (1986) (distribution; produced by Maddocks Animation)
Bill the Minder (1987) (produced by Bevanfield Films)
Stoppit and Tidyup (1988) (distribution; CMTB Animation and Queensgate Productions)
Penny Crayon (1989–1990) (distribution; produced by Maddocks Animation)
Tales of a Wise King (1989)
What-a-Mess (1990) (co-produced with Bevanfield Films)
Just So Stories (1991) (produced by Bevanfield Films)
Christopher Crocodile (1993) (co-produced with Mixpix and BBC)
Pirates (1994-1997) (produced by Childsplay Productions)
Caribou Kitchen (1995-1997) (distribution; produced by Maddocks Animation)
Jane Speakman's Tiny Tales (1996-1997) (co-produced with Martin Gates Productions)
Grabbit the Rabbit (1996)
Chatterhappy Ponies
The Forgotten Toys (1997–1999) (co-produced with United Productions, Hibbert Ralph Entertainment, and Meridian Broadcasting)
Teddybears (1997–2000) (co-produced with United Productions)
Preston Pig (2000) (co-produced with Varga London)
Ethelbert the Tiger (2001) (co-produced with Millimages)
Fairy Tales (produced by Bevanfield Films)
Eye of the Storm (co-produced with Meridian Broadcasting and Pater Tabern)
Jack and Marcel

Woodland Animations

Tell-Tale Productions

Filmation

NOTE: This list does not include shows not owned by DreamWorks Animation.
The Archie Show (1968)
The Archie Comedy Hour (1969)
The Hardy Boys (1969) 
Sabrina and the Groovie Goolies (1970) (Co-produced with The Sabrina Company)
Archie's Funhouse (live-action/animation hybrid) (1970)
Archie's TV Funnies (1971)
Fat Albert and the Cosby Kids (1972-1976)	
Lassie's Rescue Rangers (1972–1973)
The U.S. of Archie (1974)
The Secret Lives of Waldo Kitty (1975)
The Ghost Busters (live-action) (1975)
Uncle Croc's Block (1975) (featuring Fraidy Cat, Wacky and Packy, and M*U*S*H)
Ark II (live-action) (1976)
Space Academy (live-action) (1977)
The New Archie and Sabrina Hour (1977) (divided in midseason into  Sabrina Superwitch and Archie's Bang Shang Lollapalooza Show)
Fabulous Funnies (1978)
The New Fat Albert Show (1979–1982)
The New Adventures of Flash Gordon (1979)
Sport Billy (1980)
Blackstar (1981)
The New Adventures of Zorro (1981)
He-Man and the Masters of the Universe (1983–1985) (co-production with Mattel)
The Adventures of Fat Albert and the Cosby Kids (1984–1985)
She-Ra: Princess of Power (1985–1987) (co-production with Mattel)
Ghostbusters (1986–1988) (co-production with Tribune Entertainment)
BraveStarr (1987–1988)
The Gamesman (live-action) (1988–1989)
The International Outdoorsman (live-action) (1988–1989)

Felix the Cat Productions

Chapman Entertainment

Sky Studios

Sky Group

Living TV Group

Jupiter Entertainment

Love Productions

Television specials

Universal Television

Universal Television Alternative Studio

PolyGram Television

NBC Studios

NBCUniversal News Group
Gangs, Corps & Drugs (1989)
Drug Bust: The Longest War (1999)
Justice for All: A Gerald Rivera Special (2000)
Watergate: Legacy of Secrets (2002)
Secrets of Supervolcanoes (2005)
Shark Attack: Predator in the Panhandle (2005)
The Law That Changed America (2005)
From the Files of People Magazine: 50 Crimes That Captivated America (2005)
When the Leavees Failed (2005)
Hurricanes: Deadly Secrets (2005)
Biography of the Year (2005)
New York's Secret War (2006)
Under Investigation; Mansions, Murder & Mystery (2006)
America's Top Sleuths (2006) (co-production with Universal Television)
Virginia Tech: Eyewitness to Tragedy (2007)
Candle to Grave? (2008)
Doomed to Die? 13 Most Shocking Hollywood Curses (2008)
Kate: Her Story (2009)
Intervention with Death: Addiction with Uniform (2009) (co-production with GRB Entertainment)
Storm Stories: Missing Family (2009) (co-production with Towers Productions)
Travel Like A President (2012)
My Big Fat American Gypsy Wedding: The Aftermath) (2012) (co-production with Firecracker Films)
America's Got Talent: Wild Card (2012) (co-production with FremantleMedia North America and Syco Entertainment)
Breaking Amish: The Stunning Truth (2012) (co-production with Hot Snaked Media)
Sister Wives Tell All (2013–2019) (co-production with Figure 8 Films and Puddle Monkey Productions)
Skywire Live (2013)
Why We Did It (2014)
A Toast to 2014 (2014)
Whitney Houston Live: Her Greatest Performances (2015)
Bobby Brown: Remembering Whitney (2015)
Sister Wives: Best of Tell All (2015) (co-production with Figure 8 Films and Puddle Monkey Productions)
The Rise and Fall of El Chapo (2016)
90 Day Fiancé: Happily Ever After?: Tell All (2016) (co-production with Sharp Entertainment)
10th Date: Girls Night In (2017)
Surviving Harvey: Animals After the Storm (2017)
Phelps Vs. Shark: Great Gold Vs. Great White (2017)
Shark School with Michael Phelps (2017)
USS Indianapolis Live: From The Deep (2017)
Memory Box: Echos of 9/11 (2021)

Peacock Media Productions
Snoop & Martha's Very Tasty Halloween (2021) (co-production with Magical Elves Productions, Buzzfeed Studios and Snoopadelic Films)

DreamWorks Animation

UPA
 Mr. Magoo's Christmas Carol (1962)
 Uncle Sam Magoo (1970)

Golden Books Family Entertainment
To Lassie with Love (1974)
Little Golden Book Land (1989)
The Poky Little Puppy's First Christmas (1993)
Goldilocks and the Three Bears Sing Their Little Bittie Hearts Out (1994)
Three Little Pigs Sing A Gig (1994)

T.E. Acquisition Company, Inc.
Rankin/Bass Animated Entertainment (pre-1974)
Return to Oz (1964) (produced as Videocraft)
Rudolph the Red-Nosed Reindeer (1964) (produced as Videocraft)
The Edgar Bergen & Charlie McCarthy Show (1965)
The Ballad of Smokey the Bear (1966)
The Cricket on the Hearth (1967)
Mouse on the Mayflower (1968)
The Little Drummer Boy (1968)
Frosty the Snowman (1969)
The Mad, Mad, Mad Comedians (1970)
Santa Claus Is Comin' To Town (1970)
Here Comes Peter Cottontail (1971)
The Enchanted World of Danny Kaye: The Emperor's New Clothes (1972)
Puss in Boots (1972)
Mad Mad Mad Monsters (1972)
Willie Mays and the Say-Hey Kid (1972)
The Red Baron (1972)
That Girl in Wonderland (1973)

Tomorrow Entertainment (pre-January 1, 1975)
The Glass House (1972)
Gargoyles (1972)
A War of Children (1972)
Birds of Prey (1973)
A Brand New Life (1973)
The Fabulous Doctor Fable (1973)
The Man Who Could Talk to Kids (1973)
I Heard the Owl Call My Name (1973)
The Autobiography of Miss Jane Pittman (1974)
Tell Me Where It Hurts (1974)
Nicky's World (1974)
Larry (1974)
Born Innocent (1974)
Things in Their Season (1974)
Miles to Go Before I Sleep (1975)
Queen of the Stardust Ballroom (1975)
In This House of Brede (1975)

Entertainment Rights
A Monster Christmas (1994) (produced by Fat City Films, JWP Entertainment International, and Carrington Productions International)
Second Star to the Left (2001) (co-production with Silver Fox Films and BBC)
Postman Pat:
Postman Pat and the Greendale Rocket (2003)
Postman Pat's Magic Christmas (2003)
Postman Pat Clowns Around (2004)
Postman Pat and the Pirate Treasure (2004)
Postman Pat's Great Big Birthday (2005)

Link Entertainment
Postman Pat:
Postman Pat's ABC (1990)
Postman Pat's 123 (1990)
Postman Pat Takes The Bus (1991)
Postman Pat And The Toy Soldiers (1991)
Postman Pat And The Tuba (1994)
Postman Pat And The Barometer (1994)
Read Along With Postman Pat (1994)
The Forgotten Toys (1995) (co-production with United Productions, Hibbert Ralph Entertainment, and Meridian Broadcasting)
The First Snow of Winter (1997) (co-production with Hibbert Ralph Entertainment and BBC)

Filmation

Archie and His New Pals (1969)
Hey, Hey, Hey, It's Fat Albert (1969)
The Archie, Sugar Sugar, Jingle Jangle Show (1970)
Lassie and the Spirit of Thunder Mountain (1972)
The Fat Albert Halloween Special (1977)
The Fat Albert Christmas Special (1977)
A Snow White Christmas (1980)
The Fat Albert Easter Special (1982)
Flash Gordon: The Greatest Adventure of All (1982)

Television movies

Universal Television
Revue Studios

Universal Television

MTE

Studios USA/USA Cable Entertainment

NBC Studios

Multimedia Motion Pictures
Formerly Carolco Television Productions until being acquired by Multimedia, product produced during the Carolco era is owned by StudioCanal.

PolyGram Television

Universal Content Productions

Sky Studios

See also
 Universal Television
 Universal Content Productions

References

Universal Studios
Television shows produced